Hans Ivar Riesel (May 28, 1929 in Stockholm – December 21, 2014) was a Swedish mathematician who discovered the 18th known Mersenne prime in 1957, using the computer BESK: this prime is 23217-1 and consists of 969 digits. He held the record for the largest known prime from 1957 to 1961, when Alexander Hurwitz discovered a larger one. Riesel also discovered the Riesel numbers as well as developing the Lucas–Lehmer–Riesel test. After having worked at the Swedish Board for Computing Machinery, he was awarded his Ph.D. from Stockholm University in 1969 for his thesis Contributions to numerical number theory, and in the same year joined the Royal Institute of Technology as a senior lecturer and associate professor.

Selected publications

See also
 Riesel number
 Riesel Sieve

References

External links
Riesel's web page
Obituary

1929 births
2014 deaths
Number theorists
Academic staff of the KTH Royal Institute of Technology
Swedish mathematicians